The 2014 Brisbane hailstorm struck Brisbane, the capital city of Queensland, Australia on 27 November 2014. The storm caused severe damage to many buildings and cars in the city. Around 40 people were injured.

Climatology and conditions
Warm, humid air over South East Queensland was hit by a cooler southerly change causing instability. Multiple cells formed near the New South Wales border and tracked northwards, with one storm intensifying into a strong supercell.

Progression of the storm
The storm struck during peak hour. It was of short duration, lasting just half an hour. While supercell storms form every year in the region it was rare for one to strike the central parts of Brisbane. Reports of giant hail were widespread across the city. The storm continued to track north, threatening suburbs in the Moreton Bay region. It passed near Redcliffe and North Lakes, around 30 or 40 minutes after the city impact, not causing anywhere near as much damage. By this time it had turned north east, and eventually shifted out to sea not long before dusk.

Aftermath
A senior forecaster at the Bureau of Meteorology described the storm as the worst in a decade. More than 100,000 homes lost power supply.  642 power-lines were brought down. Around 2,000 homes experienced roof damaged caused by hail. 39 people were injured with 12 treated at hospitals. A number of planes were flipped over at Archerfield Airport. More than 12 schools were closed following the storm. Brisbane City Council and State Government buildings suffered $50 million worth of damage.

In mid February 2015, it was estimated the storm caused $1.1 billion worth of damage.  Many drivers were caught unaware and unable to escape the hail.  According to the Insurance Council of Australia 100,000 insurance claims have been lodged with almost two thirds for vehicles.  Hail-damaged cars were expected to undergo repairs until the end of 2015.

See also

List of costly or deadly hailstorms
Severe storms in Australia

References

External links

Disasters in Queensland
Natural disasters in Australia
Disasters in Brisbane
2014-11
Brisbane hailstorm
Brisbane hailstorm
Brisbane hailstorm
2014 Brisbane hailstorm
2010s in Brisbane
Brisbane